East Meets West, known in the United States as Thrive Networks, is an international non-governmental organization pioneering evidence-based programs and technologies in health, water and sanitation, and education for under-served populations in Asia and Africa. It was founded in 1988 by author and humanitarian Le Ly Hayslip, and is based in Oakland, California, USA.

It operates in the fields of healthcare, education, and clean water and sanitation aiming to help people in Asia to achieve self-sufficiency.

Among the key programs are: providing low-income children with education, clean water and medical care, surgery program to heal heart defects in children (Operation Healthy Heart), scholarship program to improve educational outcomes (SPELL), dental program, support for children with disabilities, and a clean water and sanitation program.

In 2011, East Meets West invested over US$13 million on its programs. East Meets West has a four-star rating  and was listed as one of the "10 Charities Expanding in a Hurry"  on Charity Navigator.

In 2014, EMW relaunched in the United States as Thrive Networks.

History 
East Meets West was established by Le Ly Hayslip, whose life story was chronicled in two books she wrote and in Oliver Stone's film, Heaven & Earth, based on her memoir When Heaven and Earth Changed Places. In 1988, she visited her native village in Ky La in Central Vietnam to begin healing of the war wounds and plant the seeds of reconciliation.

From Le Ly's early projects - Mothers Love Pediatric Clinic and Peace Village Medical Center - East Meets West emerged as a non-governmental organization (NGO) in Vietnam, which realized many socially important projects in the country.

In 1993, East Meets West received a grant from United States Agency for International Development (USAID) and constructed the Village of Hope, a shelter and safe haven for 136 needy children from Central Vietnam.

Since 1998 the organization in partnership with Atlantic Philanthropies has participated in building of Vietnam's medical and educational infrastructure, including university libraries and general hospitals, including a 200-bed cardiovascular center in Huế and a twelve-story English Language training center in Da Nang.

In 2003, John Anner left the Independent Press Association to head East Meets West.

In 2006, East Meets West co-organized medical equipment donation for Viet Duc Hospital in Hanoi.

In 2008, EMW began its expansion to Laos, Cambodia, and Timor Leste, with subsequent programming in the Philippines, India, and Myanmar.

In 2012, the Bill and Melinda Gates Foundation awarded East Meets West a US$10.9 million grant to improve sanitation and hygiene practices among the rural poor in Vietnam and Cambodia.

In 2013, EMW and Blue Planet Network signed a definitive agreement to merge, bringing together EMW's “pay for performance” water and sanitation programs and Blue Planet Network's online collaboration and impact analysis platform.

In 2014, EMW relaunched in the United States as Thrive Networks, but continues to operate as East Meets West in Asia. Thrive Networks adopts a new nonprofit business model: using mergers and shared ventures to increase impact.

In 2015, after 13 years with EMW/Thrive Networks, John Anner stepped down as CEO. 

In 2016, EMW Vietnam welcomed new Country Director, Loan Duong.

Programs

Education programs 

The Scholarship Program to Enhance Learning and Literacy (SPELL) program provides 10-year scholarships to children from Vietnam's poorest families.

The anti-trafficking ADAPT program, implemented by EMW's partner Pacific Links Foundation, works to stop trafficking at the source by providing vulnerable girls with resources.

The School Construction program builds primary schools and kindergartens in rural areas so more children can attend school. Vietnam does not have enough schools to meet the needs of its population EMW has also helped fill in the gaps in Vietnam's higher education system by building key educational facilities such as university libraries, research centers and sports complexes.

Village of Hope is EMW's disadvantaged children's center that provides children from the most difficult circumstances with a safe haven where they receive a full education, job training and skills to help them reintegrate into society.

Healthcare programs 

Through the healthcare programs, EMW provides direct assistance to individuals, supports families, trains medical staff and works to improve systemic capacity by developing and constructing improved medical facilities.

The Breath of Life (BOL) neo-natal health program treats over 50,000 babies a year through appropriate technologies. BOL provides custom-designed, low-cost equipment to hospitals, and targeted training to medical personnel, to save the lives of infants suffering from common newborn pathologies. To ensure sustainability, BOL works to strengthen linkages with local health authorities to involve them in integrating these technologies into the larger health system. EMW's neonatal health model was adapted and replicated to serve Laos, Cambodia, Timor Leste in 2008 and more recently in India, Myanmar and the Philippines. BOL formed a major partnership with GE Healthcare in 2011.

The EMW Dental Program serves 15,000 Vietnamese children annually through its modern dental clinic, school dental trailer and rural outreach project that utilizes portable field equipment. The program recently treated its 100,000th patient.

The Operation Healthy Heart program addresses the most common birth defect, congenital heart disease, by providing lifesaving cardiac surgery to critically ill children. In addition, EMW provides training to medical staff in numerous hospitals.

EMW provides a comprehensive support system for the disabled through its Support Network for People with Disabilities (SN-PWD) and its INSPIRE Sports program. Many of these disabilities are caused by exposure to Agent Orange and dioxin, an issue EMW is addressing through a new campaign of healing for Agent Orange survivors.

EMW builds key medical institutions that are a crucial link between our grassroots development programs and large-scale capacity building. In the past decade, with major support from the Atlantic Philanthropies, EMW has invested over $50 million in building large-scale hospitals in Vietnam.

In 2015, Embrace, a non-profit organization founded at Stanford University in 2008 to treat newborns suffering from hypothermia, joined Thrive Networks’ healthcare programs. EMW/Thrive's health portfolio strategy and scope of work was refined to focus on newborn health.

Clean water and sanitation 
Through the Clean Water & Sanitation Program, EMW provides a sustainable water supply to communities and ensures that the local people are fully invested in the project. To maximize the health benefits, EMW incorporates a hygiene and sanitation training component to address the need for improved sanitation, another critical public health issue.

Accountability and results of the EMW water system model are insured by the Output-Based Approach, where funders such as the World Bank  provide reimbursement for a water system only after its functionality is tested and a requisite number of household connections verified. While most villagers pay for their monthly water usage, the program subsidizes the costs of pipe connections and fees for water delivery to the neediest through its “Poorest of the Poor” program.

The program's critical sanitation component supports hygiene behavioral change by promoting awareness of practices such as hand washing, installing hand washing stations in schools and building hygienic latrines in communities with existing EMW water systems.

To date, EMW has helped finance the construction of 12,500 latrines in partnership with Watershed Asia and USAID. Since the Clean Water & Sanitation Program's inception, EMW has built over 200 water systems and brought improved sanitation to almost 62,500 people.

EMW received a US$10.9 million grant from the Bill and Melinda Gates Foundation to improve sanitation and hygiene practices among the rural poor in Vietnam and Cambodia.  EMW's program will benefit 1.7 million people in 344,000 households and 290 communes in Vietnam and Cambodia while working with local organizations, government partners, banks and private enterprises. The grant uses a results-based approach to sanitation and hygiene aid, which requires an initial investment from recipient families and communes, and then rewards them when results are achieved.

Partners and Funding 
EMW partners with government organizations, international organizations, foundations, local associations, hospitals, and educational institutions to enhance the quality of their programs and expand its scope and impact. Key partnerships include: GE Healthcare, Design that Matters, Blue Planet Network, VNHELP, Aspen Network of Development Entrepreneurs, Osprey Packs, Masimo, International Children Assistance Network (ICAN), Evidence Action, Design that Matters, MTTS, and Pacific Links.

EMW receives funding support from government agencies, foundations, corporations and individuals. Key funding includes The Bill and Melinda Gates Foundation, The Global Partnership on Output-based aid, USAID, AusAID, Irish Aid, The Atlantic Philanthropies, The Lemelson Foundation,  The Ford Foundation, The Boeing Company, The University of North Carolina at Chapel Hill, Wellcome Trust and Dubai Cares.

Geographic areas served
Thrive Networks/East Meets West is currently serving communities in nine countries throughout Asia and Africa, including Vietnam, Cambodia, Laos, India, the Philippines, Myanmar, Afghanistan, Benin and Uganda.

See also
Le Ly Hayslip
Global Village Foundation
List of non-governmental organizations in Vietnam

References

Children's charities based in the United States
Health charities in the United States
Charities based in California
Medical and health organizations based in California
Foreign charities operating in Vietnam
1988 establishments in California
Organizations based in Oakland, California